Finders Keepers  is a 1921 silent Western film based on a book by Robert Ames Bennett and directed by Otis B. Thayer, starring Edmund Cobb and Violet Mersereau. The film was shot in Denver, Colorado by the Thayer's Art-O-Graf film company. The film is now considered a lost film.

Plot
Amy Lindel, a church choir singer heads to the city to make a fortune with her voice and finds out she can only get jobs cabaret singing. Two men fall for her, one of which plants stolen diamonds on her. Threatened with arrest she throws herself in a lake, she is saved by the good guy who she marries.

Cast
 Edmund Cobb as Paul Rutledge
 Violet Mersereau as Amy Lindel
 Dorothy Bridges as Oliva Satterlee (née and credited as Dorothy Simpson)
 Verne Layton as Hobart Keith 
 S. May Stone as Mrs. Satterlee

Crew
 Otis B. Thayer Managing Director
 Vernon L. Walker Head Cameraman
 H. Haller Murphy Cameraman

References

External links
 

1921 films
1921 Western (genre) films
American black-and-white films
Films directed by Otis B. Thayer
Films shot in Colorado
Films based on American novels
Silent American Western (genre) films
1920s English-language films
1920s American films